A pacifier is an artificial nipple given to an infant to suck upon.

Pacifier may also refer to:

 Pacifier (band), a short-lived name for the New Zealand band Shihad
 Pacifier (Shihad album), by Shihad (as Pacifier), 2002
 Pacifier (Nothingface album) or the title song, 1997
 "Pacifier" (song), by Catfish and the Bottlemen, 2014
 The Pacifier,  a 2005 action comedy film starring Vin Diesel
 "The Pacifier" (The Simpsons short), a 1987 animated short